A sheriffdom is a judicial district in Scotland, led by a sheriff principal. Since 1 January 1975, there have been six sheriffdoms. Each sheriffdom is divided into a series of sheriff court districts, and each sheriff court is presided over by a resident or floating sheriff (a legally qualified judge). Sheriffs principal and resident or floating sheriffs are all members of the judiciary of Scotland.

History

Before 1975

Sheriffdoms were originally identical to the shires of Scotland, originating in the twelfth century. Until the eighteenth century the office of sheriff was often hereditary, but this was ended following the unsuccessful Jacobite Rising of 1745. The Heritable Jurisdictions Act 1747 revested the government of the shires in the Crown, compensating those office holders who were displaced. The Sheriffs (Scotland) Act 1747 reduced the office of sheriff principal to a largely ceremonial one, with a sheriff depute or sheriff substitute appointed to each "county, shire or stewartry". The sheriff deputes, who were paid a salary by the Crown, were qualified advocates and took charge of sheriff courts. By the nineteenth century, the office of sheriff principal was an additional title held by the lord lieutenant of the county, and the Circuit Courts (Scotland) Act 1828 redesignated sheriff deputes as simply "sheriffs".

The Sheriffs Act of 1747 also began the grouping of two or more counties under a single sheriffdom. This process continued so that by 1975 there were 12 sheriffdoms with only the county of Lanarkshire not combined.

Since 1975
New boundaries defined sheriffdoms in reference to regions, districts and islands areas which were then to be created on 16 May 1975. This reduced the number of sheriffdoms to six.
 
The sheriffdoms were redefined again with effect from 1 April 1996, when new local government areas were created. The boundaries of four sheriffdoms were unchanged. The boundaries of the other two were altered, so as to transfer an area around Chryston from the sheriffdom of Glasgow and Strathkelvin to the sheriffdom of South Strathclyde, Dumfries and Galloway. Elsewhere boundaries were simply redefined by reference to new local authority areas and electoral wards.

 
Each sheriffdom has a full-time Sheriff Principal. Sheriffdoms are divided into Sheriff Court Districts, each with one or more sheriff.

Notes and references 

Scots law
Administrative divisions of Scotland